Meteugoa fasciosa is a moth of the family Erebidae. It was described by Rothschild and Jordan in 1901. It is found on the Solomon Islands.

References

 Natural History Museum Lepidoptera generic names catalog

Moths described in 1901
Lithosiini